A riboside is any glycoside of ribose.  Ribosides in the form of ribonucleosides and ribonucleotides play an important role in biochemistry.

References

External links